Shannon FIR is the flight information region (FIR) for the country of Ireland. The Irish Aviation Authority is responsible for providing air traffic control in this area and for regulating Irish aviation.

Its ICAO code is EISN.

Its boundaries are from surface to flight level (FL) 660. The class G airspace exists outside the control zones (CTRs – class C airspace) and control areas (CTAs - class A & C airspace), up to FL75. The high level (FL245-FL660) above the area around Donegal Co., is controlled by the Scottish Control (EGPX).

The Shannon FIR contains the SOTA (Shannon Oceanic Transition Area) and NOTA (North Oceanic Transition Area), as of the start of 2006. The airspace is class A airspace from FL55 to FL660.

External links
 Irish Aviation Authority

References

Air traffic control centers
Aviation in the Republic of Ireland
Air traffic control in Europe